μTorrent, or uTorrent (see pronunciation) is a proprietary adware BitTorrent client owned and developed by Rainberry, Inc. The "μ" (Greek letter "mu") in its name comes from the SI prefix "micro-", referring to the program's small memory footprint: the program was designed to use minimal computer resources while offering functionality comparable to larger BitTorrent clients such as Vuze or BitComet. μTorrent became controversial in 2015 when many users unknowingly accepted a default option during installation which also installed a cryptocurrency miner.

The program has been in active development since its first release in 2005. Although originally developed by Ludvig Strigeus, since December 7, 2006, the code is owned and maintained by BitTorrent, Inc. The code has also been employed by BitTorrent, Inc. as the basis for version 6.0 and above of the BitTorrent client, a re-branded version of μTorrent. All versions are written in C++.

History

Early  development 
Out of general discontent with bloatware, Serge Paquet suggested to Ludvig Strigeus that he should make a smaller and more efficient BitTorrent client. Strigeus began to conceptualize the plans for the program's development, which, at the time, did not include making the client feature-rich. After initially working on it for about a month during the last quarter of 2004 (the first build is dated October 17, 2004), mostly during his free time before and after work, Strigeus ceased coding μTorrent for a year. He resumed work on September 15, 2005, and three days later, the first public release (version 1.1 beta) was made available as free software, and began generating feedback.

PeerFactor SARL 
On March 4, 2006, PeerFactor SARL announced the signing of a six-month contract with Strigeus for the development of "new content distribution applications on the Web." PeerFactor SARL is a relatively new company formed by former employees of PeerFactor, which was a subsidiary of the French anti-piracy organization Retspan.

Ludde stated that his coding for PeerFactor SARL was to use his expertise at optimization of the BitTorrent protocol to create a .dll which PeerFactor SARL intended to use as part of a distribution platform for files in a corporate setting. At the time there was some speculation that μTorrent may have been modified to spy on users on Peerfactor's behalf, however to date (even following μTorrent's acquisition by BitTorrent, Inc.) no evidence has been produced to support these allegations.

Ownership change 
On December 7, 2006, μTorrent was purchased by BitTorrent, Inc.

On September 18, 2007, BitTorrent 6.0 was released. Although previous versions of the BitTorrent client had been open source software, with version 6 it became proprietary.

In April 2017, BitTorrent founder Bram Cohen announced that the next version of μTorrent would be web browser based. This μTorrent version allows users to stream torrents from the default web browser, similar to a regular streaming site.

Features 
Features present in μTorrent include:
 Magnet Links (URIs), added in version 1.8, released on August 9, 2008.
 Teredo tunneling / IPv6 support
 Micro Transport Protocol (µTP) preliminary support as of 1.8.2 with full-support added in 2.0
 UPnP support for all versions of Windows, without needing Windows XP's UPnP framework
 Protocol encryption (PE)
 Peer exchange (PEX) with other BitTorrent clients:
 libtorrent and clients based on it like Deluge or qBittorrent have full μTorrent PEX support
 Transmission and clients based on libTransmission have full μTorrent PEX support
 KTorrent has full μTorrent PEX support as of 2.1 RC1
 Vuze, formerly Azureus, has full support as of version 3.0.4.3
 RSS ("broadcatching")
 "Trackerless" BitTorrent support using DHT, compatible with the original BitTorrent client and BitComet
 User configurable intelligent disk caching system
 Full proxy server support
 HTTPS tracker support
 Configurable bandwidth scheduler
 Localized for 67 languages.
 Initial seeding of torrents
 Customizable search bar & user interface design.
 Configuration settings and temporary files are stored in a single directory, allowing portable use
 WebUI: A plugin currently in beta testing that allows μTorrent running on one computer to be controlled from another computer, either across the internet or on a LAN, using a Web browser
 Embedded Tracker: a simple tracker designed for seeding torrents, lacking a web interface or list of hosted torrents. It is not designed for secure or large-scale application.
 Quick-resumes interrupted transfers
 Two "easter eggs" in the About subsection of Help: clicking the μTorrent logo plays a Deep Note-like sound effect, and typing the letter "t" starts a Tetris-like game called μTris, which in 2008 was selected as #1 of the "Top 10 Software Easter Eggs" by LifeHacker.
The ability to use encryption of all traffic to bypass torrent blocking on the network.

Size 
μTorrent is shipped as a single stand-alone compressed executable file, installed at first run. Recent versions have included the ability to install themselves on first run. Small executable size is achieved by avoiding the use of many libraries, notably the C++ standard library and stream facilities, and creating substitutes written specifically for the program. The executable is then compressed to roughly half of its compiled and linked size using UPX.

Operating system support 

μTorrent is available for Microsoft Windows, macOS, and Android. A μTorrent Server is also available for Linux.

The first test version for macOS, running on Mac OS X Leopard, was released on 27 November 2008.

On September 2, 2010, the native Linux version of μTorrent Server was released. Firon, an administrator of the μTorrent community forum, said that they had been working on this project for a few months prior to the release as it was the most requested feature for some time. This release is intended for users who are seeking a fast command-line interface based BitTorrent client with a remote web-based management. They also mentioned that a full featured client with a GUI is a work in progress.

As of 2020, μTorrent server for Linux suppports Debian 6.0 or later and Ubuntu 12 or later, with both 32-bit & 64-bit options available.

On August 1, 2019, μTorrent announced that users who upgrade to Mac OS Catalina will be upgraded to μTorrent web automatically, since that version of MacOS (and subsequent releases) supports 64-bit applications only.

Currently, μTorrent supports Windows XP or later, Mac OS X Snow Leopard or later and Android 5.0 or later.

Revenue 
In early versions, Strigeus had built in a web redirection via nanotorrent for search queries entered through the search bar that displayed advertisements in a frame on the web browser. Some users thought this suspicious because tracking could be implemented by recording the IP addresses of those downloading/receiving the advertisements, and the search functionality could easily be used to track user queries through whichever web-interface the client is going through to execute the search. After a short trial period, the advertising was disabled, mitigating possible concerns.

A later version of the software has, instead of ads, a "search all sites" feature, which is a keyword-based search bar that delivers listings of torrent files at different trackers. A frame at the top displays advertisements (server-side) in the browser when the search function is used. In version 1.5, no ads are present in the program itself.

As of build 463, a redirect bypass feature became available in the Advanced options.

As of version 1.8.2, the μTorrent installer gives the user the option to download and install the Ask.com toolbar. This is done on the first run of the program and the user may explicitly opt out of this feature by deselecting it. The developers stated the addition was needed for funds to continue development. In late 2010, this was replaced with the Conduit Engine.

Currently, μTorrent generates revenue through in-content advertisements (in the free version for windows) and the "pro" version, which is available in 3 bundles (available for both classic & web client for windows).

Toolbars 
In late 2010, some controversy arose with a release of μTorrent which included adware in the form of the Conduit Engine, which installed a toolbar, and made homepage and default search engine changes to a user's web browser. A number of users reported that the installation was made without the user's consent. There were some complaints that the adware software was difficult to remove.
In 2011, μTorrent bundled the Bing Toolbar.

Paid version 
On July 15, 2011, BitTorrent announced that they would offer a paid version of μTorrent called "μTorrent Plus". This new version would offer extra features, such as integrated file conversion, anti-virus and a built in media player. On 6 October 2011, the Pre-alpha of μTorrent Plus was released to an invitation only community. As of December 2011, μTorrentPlus 3.1 was available for $24.95; as of December 2014, the Plus version was available as a $19.95 yearly subscription.

Ads and malware 
In August 2012, BitTorrent announced the addition of advertising in the free version of µTorrent which could be individually dismissed by users. Due to response from users, a few days later, the company stated that ads could be optionally turned off. A user-created tool known as "Pimp My µTorrent" was also created to  simplify the process of disabling ads in the Windows version. Starting with µTorrent version 3.2.2, the software also contains in-content advertisements described as "Featured Torrent". As with ads, it is possible to disable this content.

In March 2015, it was alleged that μTorrent had automatically installed a program known as Epic Scale: a program classified as "riskware" by some security programs, which mines the cryptocurrency Litecoin in the background for BitTorrent, Inc. (allegedly giving a portion to charity), utilizing CPU and GPU power. A μTorrent developer disputed the claim that it was automatically installed, and claimed that as with all other "partner" programs bundled with the software, users could decline the installation. On 28 March, Epic Scale was permanently removed from the installation and as a software bundle partner.

Russian and Ukrainian users of μTorrent are being tricked into installing Yandex Browser and other Yandex-produced software.

Pronunciation 
An admin on the μTorrent forums wrote in 2005, "I don't really know how it's pronounced... ...I usually say 'you torrent' because it looks like a u", while stating they were not sure, they also mentioned the  correct pronunciations for "μTorrent"  "microtorrent", "mytorrent" (as "my"  is the Swedish pronunciation of the Greek letter μ) and "mutorrent". In Greece, where the software is widely
used, it is called 'me torrent', since the letter μ of the Greek Alphabet is pronounced [mi] in modern Greek.
The symbol μ is the lowercase Greek letter mu, which stands for the SI prefix "micro-".  It refers to the program's originally small footprint.

Contributors 
Original development was performed by Ludvig Strigeus ("ludde", from Sweden), the creator of μTorrent. Serge Paquet ("vurlix", from Canada) acted as release coordinator, and had intended to work on Linux and macOS ports. He maintained the μTorrent website and forum up until the end of 2005, but is no longer affiliated with μTorrent.

Since its purchase in 2006, development has been performed by various employees of Bittorrent Inc. Strigeus is no longer affiliated.

Reception 
μTorrent has been praised for its small size and minimal computer resources used, which set it apart from other clients. PC Magazine stated that it "packs an outstanding array of features" in 2006 and listed it in their 2008 "Best free 157 software tools". It was also in PC World's "101 Fantastic freebies". The website TorrentFreak.com said it was the most feature rich BitTorrent client available, later summarizing a 2009 University of California, Riverside study which concluded that "μTorrent Download Speeds Beat Vuze By 16%" on average and "on 10% of [the 30 most used] ISPs, μTorrent users were downloading 30% faster than Vuze users". About.com said it was the best BitTorrent client available, citing its small size and "minimal impact to the rest of your computer's speed." Wired.com said its "memory footprint is also ridiculously small". PC & Tech Authority magazine (Australia) gave it 6 stars (out of 6). Lifehacker.com rated it the best BitTorrent client available (Windows) in 2008, 2011 (Windows and Mac) and a follow-up user poll rated it the most popular torrent client in 2015. CNET.com gave it 5 stars (of 5) saying it features "light and quick downloading".

In November 2009, 52 million users were reported to be using the application, and in late 2011, 132 million.

According to a study by Arbor Networks, the 2008 adoption of IPv6 by μTorrent caused a 15-fold increase in IPv6 traffic across the Internet over a ten-month period.

See also 
 Comparison of BitTorrent clients

References

External links 
 
 
 uTorrent: A Beginner's Guide to BitTorrent Downloading by Jared M
 p2pnet uTorrent interview by Alex H
 Can great software live in 130 kilobytes? by George Ou
 Glasnost test BitTorrent traffic shaping (Max Planck Institute for Software Systems)

Android (operating system) software
BitTorrent clients
2005 software
C++ software
Cross-platform software
Freemium
Adware
MacOS file sharing software
Windows file sharing software
Portable software
Proprietary freeware for Linux
BitTorrent clients for Linux
Internet properties established in 2005